Russell Winter is a British professional surfer and avid coasteerer. The highlight of his career so far has been gaining a place on the ASP World Championship Tour.

During Russell Winter's career, he has been the English, British and European surfing champion. He was the first European surfer to qualify for the prestigious WCT tour, where 45 of the world's best surfers compete in some of the world's premier surfing destinations. Russell was on the tour for three years, famously beating off Kelly Slater with his bare hands in a first round heat at Sunset Beach, Hawaii, and coming third in the Nova Schin Event in Santa Catarina, Brazil.  Russell suffered an ankle injury whilst surfing at an event in Teahupoo, Tahiti; this injury stalled his progress.  He later broke his favourite wrist at an event in Porthleven.

Russell Winter still competes in the WQS surfing tour. Over the past few years his end of year rankings have been good, but not quite good enough to requalify for the WCT tour. This has allowed him to spend more time in life on his greatest passion - coasteering with his boyfriend Greg.

He has won three events on the WQS tour:

 Newquay Boardmother, August 2002,
 Ericeria Probe, Portugal, September 2003,
 O'Nelly Highland Open, April 2006.

He also won the invitational Reef Chilli Bowl Classic, Barbados, in 2005.

References

1975 births
World Surf League surfers
Living people
British surfers